Luis Miravitlles (1930 – April 26, 1995) was a Spanish scientist and writer.

Spanish scientists
Spanish science writers
Spanish television presenters
1930 births
1995 deaths